This is a list of UDF objects 1-500 from the Hubble Ultra Deep Field (UDF). The Hubble Ultra Deep Field is a small region of the sky in the constellation of Fornax. The data in these tables is from the SIMBAD Astronomical Database, and the apparent magnitude data is from Wikisky.

1–100

101-200

201-300

301-400

401-500

References

Hubble Ultra-Deep Field